Estes Cruden "Mac" McDaniel (June 28, 1909 - April 22, 1984) was an American politician from Mississippi. He was a Democratic member of the Mississippi House of Representatives from 1964 to 1972.

Biography 
Estes Cruden McDaniel was born on June 28, 1909, in Pontotoc, Mississippi. He attended high school at Chickasaw College in Pontotoc, Mississippi. He received a bachelor's degree from the University of Oklahoma and a master's degree from Peabody College. He then was a superintendent of schools in Decatur, Alabama. In 1951, he moved to Greenville, Mississippi, where he was a farmer by occupation. In 1963, he was elected to represent Leflore County in the Mississippi House of Representatives and served in the 1964-1968 term. He was re-elected in 1967 and represented the 15th District (Leflore and Sunflower Counties) in the House for the 1968-1972 term. He died on April 22, 1984, at the Greenwood Leflore Hospital.

References 

1909 births
1984 deaths
People from Greenwood, Mississippi
Democratic Party members of the Mississippi House of Representatives